Paul Bailey FRSL (born 16 February 1937) is a British novelist and critic, as well as a biographer of Cynthia Payne and Quentin Crisp.

Biography
Paul Bailey attended Sir Walter St John's Grammar School For Boys in Battersea, London. He won a scholarship to the Central School of Speech and Drama in 1953 and worked as an actor between 1956 and 1964. He became a freelance writer in 1967.

He was appointed Literary Fellow at Newcastle and Durham Universities (1972–74), and was awarded a Bicentennial Fellowship in 1976, enabling him to travel to the US, where he was Visiting Lecturer in English Literature at the North Dakota State University (1977–79). He was awarded the E. M. Forster Award in 1974 and in 1978 he won the George Orwell Memorial Prize for his essay "The Limitations of Despair", first published in The Listener magazine. Bailey was elected a Fellow of the Royal Society of Literature in 1999.

Bailey's novels include At The Jerusalem (1967), which is set in an old people's home, and which won a Somerset Maugham Award and an Arts Council Writers' Award; Peter Smart's Confessions (1977) and Gabriel's Lament (1986), both shortlisted for the Booker Prize for Fiction; and Sugar Cane (1993), a sequel to Gabriel's Lament. Kitty and Virgil (1998) is the story of the relationship between an Englishwoman and an exiled Romanian poet. In Uncle Rudolf (2002), the narrator looks back on his colourful life and his rescue as a young boy from a likely death in fascist Romania, by his uncle, a gifted lyric tenor and the novel's eponymous hero. In his book "Chapman's Odyssey" (2011), the main character, Harry Chapman, in morphine-induced delirium, encounters characters from literature, writers, deceased friends and family members as he lies seriously ill in a London hospital. Despite his melancholy and fear, Harry entertains the nurses with recitations of some of the favourite poems he has memorised in a lifetime of reading. Bailey's most recent book is The Prince's Boy (2014), a melancholic gay love story that spans four decades.

Bailey has also written plays for radio and television: At Cousin Henry's was broadcast in 1964 and his adaptation of Joe Ackerley's We Think the World of You was televised in 1980. His non-fiction books include a volume of memoir, entitled An Immaculate Mistake: Scenes from Childhood and Beyond (1990), and Three Queer Lives: An Alternative Biography of Naomi Jacob, Fred Barnes and Arthur Marshall (2001), a biography of three gay popular entertainers from the twentieth century.

Bailey is also known as a literary critic, and contributor to The Guardian and in 2001 headed an all-male "alternative" judging panel for the Orange Prize.

Bibliography
At The Jerusalem (1967) – winner of the Author's Club First Novel Award and Somerset Maugham Award
Trespasses (1970)
A Distant Likeness (1973)
Peter Smart's Confessions (1977), shortlisted for the Booker Prize
Old Soldiers (1980)
An English Madam: The Life and Work of Cynthia Payne (1982)
Gabriel's Lament (1986), shortlisted for the Booker Prize 
An Immaculate Mistake: Scenes from Childhood and Beyond  (1990)
Sugar Cane (1993)
The Oxford Book of London (ed., 1995)
First Love (ed., 1997)
Kitty and Virgil (1998)
The Stately Homo: A Celebration of the Life of Quentin Crisp (ed., 2000)
Three Queer Lives: An Alternative Biography of Naomi Jacob, Fred Barnes and Arthur Marshall (2001)
Uncle Rudolf (2002)
A Dog's Life (2003)
Chapman's Odyssey (2011)
The Prince's Boy (2014)

References

External links
  includes a brief analysis of his work.
 Tate Etc. Issue 12 / Spring 2008.
 

1937 births
20th-century British male writers
20th-century British writers
20th-century British non-fiction writers
20th-century British novelists
21st-century British male writers
21st-century British non-fiction writers
21st-century British novelists
Academics of Kingston University
Alumni of the Royal Central School of Speech and Drama
British biographers
British gay writers
British LGBT novelists
British male non-fiction writers
Fellows of the Royal Society of Literature
Living people
People educated at Sir Walter St John's Grammar School For Boys